Peeter Jalakas (born 5 January 1961 in Tallinn) is an Estonian theatre director, producer, playwright and restaurateur.

In 1987, he established Estonia's first independent theatre company: VAT Theatre. In 1989 he established the theatre group Ruto Killakund. He is also the founder of theatre festival Baltoscandal. In 1992 he established Von Krahl Theatre.

In 2015, he was awarded with Order of the White Star, IV class.

References

1961 births
Living people
Estonian theatre directors
Estonian dramatists and playwrights
Estonian businesspeople
Recipients of the Order of the White Star, 4th Class
Tallinn University alumni
Writers from Tallinn
People from Tallinn